Bezovje nad Zrečami is a small settlement in the Municipality of Zreče in northeastern Slovenia. The area is part of the traditional region of Styria. It is now included with the rest of the municipality in the Savinja Statistical Region.

Name
The name of the settlement was changed from Bezovje to Bezovje nad Zrečami in 1953.

References

External links
Bezovje nad Zrečami at Geopedia

Populated places in the Municipality of Zreče